Mercury was a pigeon who received the Dickin Medal in 1946 from the People's Dispensary for Sick Animals for bravery in service during the Second World War.

Mercury served with the National Pigeon Service (Special Section).  It received the award for delivering secret messages involving a  flight from Northern Denmark in 1942.

See also
 List of individual birds

References

External links
 PDSA Dickin Medal

Recipients of the Dickin Medal
Individual domesticated pigeons